This is a list of cytochrome P450 modulators, or inhibitors and inducers of cytochrome P450 enzymes.

List of Herbal cytochrome P450 Inhibitors and Inducers 
In alphabetical order.

See also
 List of steroid metabolism modulators

Sources
Includes information found online including these sites:

 
 
 
 
 

Cytochrome P450 modulators